Franklin Township is one of thirteen townships in Putnam County, Indiana. As of the 2010 census, its population was 1,690 and it contained 720 housing units.

History
The Samuel Brown House was listed on the National Register of Historic Places in 2006.

Geography

Cities and towns
 Roachdale (partial)

Unincorporated towns
 Carpentersville at 
 Fincastle at 
 Raccoon at 
(This list is based on USGS data and may include former settlements.)

Education
Township residents are served by the Roachdale-Franklin Township Public Library.

References

External links
 Indiana Township Association
 United Township Association of Indiana

Townships in Putnam County, Indiana
Townships in Indiana